Locksmithing is the science and art of making and defeating locks. Locksmithing is a traditional trade and in many countries requires completion of an apprenticeship. The level of formal education legally required varies from country to country from none at all, to a simple training certificate awarded by an employer, to a full diploma from an engineering college (such as in Australia), in addition to time spent working as an apprentice.

Terminology
A lock is a mechanism that secures buildings, rooms, cabinets, objects, or other storage facilities.  A "smith" is a metalworker who shapes metal pieces, often using a forge or mould, into useful objects or to be part of a more complex structure. Thus locksmithing, as its name implies, is the assembly and designing of locks and their respective keys by hand.  Most locksmiths use automatic and manual cutting tools to mold keys; most are power tools having battery or mains electricity as their power source.

Work
Locks have been constructed for over 2500 years, initially out of wood and later out of metal. Historically, locksmiths would make the entire lock, working for hours hand cutting screws and doing much file-work. Lock designs became significantly more complicated in the 18th century, and locksmiths often specialized in repairing or designing locks.

After the rise of cheap mass production, the vast majority of locks are repaired by swapping parts or like-for-like replacement or upgraded to modern mass-production items. Until more recently, safes and strongboxes were the exceptions to this, and large bank vaults are custom designed and built at great cost, the very limited scope for mass production of vaults means it is more difficult to realize economies of scale in their manufacture, and the risk of a copy being obtained and defeated is lowered when vaults are custom-made.

Although fitting of keys to replace lost keys to automobiles and homes and the changing of keys for homes and businesses to maintain security is still an important part of locksmithing, according to a 1976 US Government publication, locksmiths today are primarily involved in the installation of higher quality lock-sets and the design, implementation, and management of keying and key control systems. Most locksmiths also do electronic lock servicing, such as making smart keys for transponder-equipped vehicles and the implementation and application of access control systems protecting individuals and assets for many large institutions.

In terms of physical security, a locksmith's work frequently involves making a determination of the level of risk to an individual or institution and then recommending and implementing appropriate combinations of equipment and policies to create "security layers" which exceed the reasonable gain to an intruder or attacker. The more different security layers are implemented, the more the requirement for additional skills and knowledge, and tools to defeat them all. But because each layer comes at an expense to the customer, the application of appropriate levels without exceeding reasonable costs to the customer is often very important and requires a skilled and knowledgeable locksmith to determine.

While a handyman can also install and replace locks, locksmiths are specialists whose involvement may be desirable for several reason. As mentioned above, their knowledge of different lock systems can help in appropriate lock selection and the establishment of best practices. Additionally, locksmiths in many places are required by law to undergo training and maintain certification.

Regulation by country

Australia 
In Australia, prospective locksmiths are required to take a Technical and Further Education (TAFE) course in locksmithing, completion of which leads to issuance of a Level 3 Australian Qualifications Framework certificate, and complete an apprenticeship. They must also pass a criminal records check certifying that they are not currently wanted by the police. Apprenticeships can last one to four years. Course requirements are variable: there is a minimal requirements version that requires fewer total training units, and a fuller version that teaches more advanced skills, but takes more time to complete. Apprenticeship and course availability vary by state or territory.

Ireland 
In Ireland, licensing for locksmiths was introduced in 2016, with locksmiths having to obtain a Private Security Authority license.
The Irish Locksmith Organisation has 50 members with ongoing training to ensure all members are up-to-date with knowledge and skills.

United Kingdom 
In the UK, there is no current government regulation for locksmithing, so effectively anyone can trade and operate as a locksmith with no skill or knowledge of the industry.

United States 
Fifteen states in the United States require licensure for locksmiths. Nassau County and New York City in New York State, and Hillsborough County and Miami-Dade County in Florida have their own licensing laws. State and local laws are described in the table below.

Employment

Locksmiths may be commercial (working out of a storefront), mobile (working out of a vehicle), institutional (employed by an institution) or investigatory (forensic locksmiths) or may specialize in one aspect of the skill, such as an automotive lock specialist, a master key system specialist or a safe technician. Many are also security consultants, but not every security consultant has the skills and knowledge of a locksmith. Locksmiths are frequently certified in specific skill areas or to a level of skill within the trade. This is separate from certificates of completion of training courses. In determining skill levels, certifications from manufacturers or locksmith associations are usually more valid criteria than certificates of completion. Some locksmiths decide to call themselves "Master Locksmiths" whether they are fully trained or not, and some training certificates appear quite authoritative.

The majority of locksmiths also work on any existing door hardware, not just locking mechanisms. This includes door closers, door hinges, electric strikes, frame repairs and other door hardware.

Full disclosure

The issue of full disclosure was first raised in the context of locksmithing, in a 19th-century controversy regarding whether weaknesses in lock systems should be kept secret in the locksmithing community, or revealed to the public.

According to A. C. Hobbs:

A commercial, and in some respects a social doubt has been started within the last year or two, whether or not it is right to discuss so openly the security or insecurity of locks. Many well-meaning persons suppose that the discussion respecting the means for baffling the supposed safety of locks offers a premium for dishonesty, by showing others how to be dishonest. This is a fallacy. Rogues are very keen in their profession, and know already much more than we can teach them respecting their several kinds of roguery.

Rogues knew a good deal about lock-picking long before locksmiths discussed it among themselves, as they have lately done. If a lock, let it have been made in whatever country, or by whatever maker, is not so inviolable as it has hitherto been deemed to be, surely it is to the interest of honest persons to know this fact, because the dishonest are tolerably certain to apply the knowledge practically; and the spread of the knowledge is necessary to give fair play to those who might suffer by ignorance.

It cannot be too earnestly urged that an acquaintance with real facts will, in the end, be better for all parties. Some time ago, when the reading public was alarmed at being told how London milk is adulterated, timid persons deprecated the exposure, on the plea that it would give instructions in the art of adulterating milk; a vain fear, milkmen knew all about it before, whether they practised it or not; and the exposure only taught purchasers the necessity of a little scrutiny and caution, leaving them to obey this necessity or not, as they pleased.

 -- From A. C. Hobbs (Charles Tomlinson, ed.), Locks and Safes: The Construction of Locks. Published by Virtue & Co., London, 1853 (revised 1868).

Notable locksmiths 

 William F. Banham, founder of Banham Security, invented the first automatic latch bolt lock in 1926 after a series of burglaries on his wife's dress shop. He opened up his own locksmith shop on Oxford Street, London, and offered £25 to anyone who could pick or break one of his patented locks  Banham Group still offer the patented locks.
 Robert Barron patented a double-acting tumbler lock in 1778, the first reasonable improvement in lock security.
 Joseph Bramah patented the Bramah lock in 1784. It was considered unpickable for 67 years until A.C. Hobbs picked it, taking over 50 hours.
 Jeremiah Chubb patented his detector lock in 1818. It won him the reward offered by the Government for a lock that could not be opened by any but its own key.
 James Sargent described the first successful key-changeable combination lock in 1857. His lock became popular with safe manufacturers and the United States Treasury Department. In 1873, he patented a time lock mechanism, the prototype for those used in contemporary bank vaults.
 Samuel Segal of the Segal Lock and Hardware Company invented the first jimmy-proof locks in 1916.
 Harry Soref founded the Master Lock Company in 1921 and patented an improved padlock in 1924 with a patent lock casing constructed out of laminated steel.
 Linus Yale Sr. invented a pin tumbler lock in 1848.
 Linus Yale Jr. improved upon his father's lock in 1861, using a smaller, flat key with serrated edges that is the basis of modern pin-tumbler locks. Yale Jr. developed the modern combination lock in 1862.
 Alfred Charles Hobbs  demonstrated the inadequacy of several respected locks of the time in 1851 at The Great Exhibition, and popularized the practice of full disclosure.

See also
 Associated Locksmiths of America
 Door security
 Glossary of locksmithing terms 
 Immobiliser
 Locksport
 Master Locksmiths Association
The National Locksmith

References

External links

 
Metalworking occupations